The 1923 International cricket season was from April 1923 to August 1923.

Season overview

May

West Indies in England

June

Scotland in Ireland

July

Scotland in Wales

August

Foresters in Netherlands

Test trial in England

References

1923 in cricket